Andrea Lázaro García (born 4 November 1994) is a Spanish professional tennis player.

Lázaro García has career-high WTA rankings of 180 in singles, achieved on 23 May 2022, and world No. 162 in doubles, set on 31 October 2022. She has won six singles and eight doubles titles on the ITF Women's Circuit.

Lázaro García made her WTA Tour debut at the 2021 Internationaux de Strasbourg, where she qualified for the main draw.

Grand Slam performance timelines

Singles

ITF finals

Singles: 12 (6 titles, 5 runner–ups, 1 canc.)

Doubles: 14 (8 titles, 6 runner–ups)

Notes

References

External links
 
 
 Andrea Lázaro García at FIU Panthers

1994 births
Living people
Spanish female tennis players
Tennis players from Barcelona
FIU Panthers women's tennis players